Karel Kratochvíl  (born 8 June 1982) is a Czech footballer currently playing for FK Kolín.

External links
 
 

1982 births
Living people
Czech footballers
Association football defenders
Czech First League players
SK Slavia Prague players
FC Hradec Králové players
SK Kladno players
Expatriate footballers in Romania
Liga I players
FC Shakhter Karagandy players
CS Gaz Metan Mediaș players
Czech expatriate sportspeople in Kazakhstan
Footballers from Prague
Czech expatriate footballers
Expatriate footballers in Kazakhstan
Czech expatriate sportspeople in Romania